Laodice (in Greek Λαοδικη; lived in the 3rd century BC), was a princess of Pontus and was one of the daughters of Mithridates II of Pontus and Laodice. Her sister was Laodice III, the first wife of Antiochus III the Great , and her brother was Mithridates III of Pontus. She married her distant maternal cousin, the Seleucid general Achaeus. When Achaeus fell into the power of Antiochus III (213 BC), Laodice was left in possession of the citadel of Sardis, in which she held out for a time, but she was quickly compelled by the dissensions among her own troops to surrender to Antiochus III. Polybius incidentally mentions that she was brought up before her marriage at Selge, in Pisidia (modern Turkey), under the care of Logbasis, a citizen of that place.

References
Polybius,  Histories, Evelyn S. Shuckburgh (translator), London - New York, (1889)
Smith, William; Dictionary of Greek and Roman Biography and Mythology, "Laodice (8)", Boston, (1867)
 D'Agostini, Monica;  Ancient History Bulletin 28 (2015): 37-60

Notes

People of the Kingdom of Pontus
Iranian people of Greek descent
3rd-century BC women
3rd-century BC Iranian people
Women in Hellenistic warfare
Ancient Greek princesses
Mithridatic dynasty